Yemelyanovsky (masculine), Yemelyanovskaya (feminine), or Yemelyanovskoye (neuter) is the name of several rural localities in Russia.

Modern localities
Yemelyanovsky, Nizhny Novgorod Oblast, a settlement in Vasilevo-Maydansky Selsoviet of Pochinkovsky District in Nizhny Novgorod Oblast
Yemelyanovsky, Novosibirsk Oblast, a settlement in Moshkovsky District of Novosibirsk Oblast
Yemelyanovskoye, a village in Kabozhskoye Settlement of Khvoyninsky District in Novgorod Oblast
Yemelyanovskaya, Cherevkovsky Selsoviet, Krasnoborsky District, Arkhangelsk Oblast, a village in Cherevkovsky Selsoviet of Krasnoborsky District in Arkhangelsk Oblast
Yemelyanovskaya, Lyakhovsky Selsoviet, Krasnoborsky District, Arkhangelsk Oblast, a village in Lyakhovsky Selsoviet of Krasnoborsky District in Arkhangelsk Oblast
Yemelyanovskaya, Telegovsky Selsoviet, Krasnoborsky District, Arkhangelsk Oblast, a village in Telegovsky Selsoviet of Krasnoborsky District in Arkhangelsk Oblast
Yemelyanovskaya, Lensky District, Arkhangelsk Oblast, a village in Slobodchikovsky Selsoviet of Lensky District in Arkhangelsk Oblast
Yemelyanovskaya, Plesetsky District, Arkhangelsk Oblast, a village in Kenozersky Selsoviet of Plesetsky District in Arkhangelsk Oblast
Yemelyanovskaya, Primorsky District, Arkhangelsk Oblast, a village in Koskogorsky Selsoviet of Primorsky District in Arkhangelsk Oblast
Yemelyanovskaya, Kirov Oblast, a village under the administrative jurisdiction of the Town of Luza in Luzsky District of Kirov Oblast; 
Yemelyanovskaya, Belozersky District, Vologda Oblast, a village in Artyushinsky Selsoviet of Belozersky District in Vologda Oblast
Yemelyanovskaya, Tarnogsky District, Vologda Oblast, a village in Nizhnespassky Selsoviet of Tarnogsky District in Vologda Oblast
Yemelyanovskaya, Vozhegodsky District, Vologda Oblast, a village in Vozhegodsky Selsoviet of Vozhegodsky District in Vologda Oblast

Alternative names
Yemelyanovskaya/Yemelyanovskoye, alternative names of Yemelyanovka, a village in Voznesenskaya Rural Territory of Yaysky District in Kemerovo Oblast;